The Texas & New Mexico Railway  is a class III short-line railroad operating in west Texas and southeast New Mexico.  The railroad line operates on 111 miles of track from a connection with the Union Pacific at Monahans, Texas, and terminates at Lovington, New Mexico.  The railroad primarily provides freight service for the oilfields and related industries in the region.

History
Lovington, New Mexico is the terminus of the TNMR.  Before 1930, the planned Gulf, Texas and New Mexico Railway proposed to construct a branch running westward from Seminole, Texas via Lovington, NM and terminating at Roswell, New Mexico.  However, the tracks were never constructed, and for a time the nearest rail line was the Atchison, Topeka and Santa Fe Railway in nearby Seagraves, Texas.

As a result of the oil discovered in the Permian Basin in 1927, the Texas–New Mexico Railway was incorporated on November 19, 1927.  Within a year the railroad fell under the control of the Texas & Pacific Railway.  Construction commenced in 1928 and the line was completed on July 20, 1930.  In 1989, what was then Union Pacific sold the property to RailTex, and short line service started on September 18, 1989.  Railtex sold to RailAmerica in February 2000, which in turn sold to Permian Basin Railways in May 2002. In September 2011, Iowa Pacific Holdings, which owned Permian Basin Railways, announced a major rebuilding of the railroad, including track upgrades and new locomotives, at a cost of more than $20 million.

In May 2015 Watco purchased the assets of the Texas – New Mexico Railroad from Iowa Pacific Holdings, and renamed the railroad the Texas & New Mexico Railway.

Ownership of the line
1930–1976: Operated as a subsidiary of the Texas & Pacific Railway (TP), which was a subsidiary of the Missouri Pacific Railroad (MP)
1976–1982: Operated by the Missouri Pacific Railroad
1982–1989: Operated by the Union Pacific
1989–1999: Owned/operated by RailTex
1999–2002: Owned/operated by RailAmerica
2002–2015: Owned/operated by Permian Basin Railways
2015–present: Owned/operated by Watco.

Route
Monahans, Texas (interchange with Union Pacific Railroad mainline)
Cloyd, Texas (no longer shown in timetables)
Prairie Spur, Texas (no longer Shown in timetables)
Wink Junction (no longer shown in timetables - abandoned branch to Wink, Texas)
Kermit, Texas
Magwait, Texas
Cheyenne, Texas (no longer shown in timetables)
Jal, New Mexico
Combest, New Mexico
United Carbon
Eunice, New Mexico
Kornegray, New Mexico (no longer shown in timetables)
Warren, New Mexico
Climax, New Mexico
Hobbs, New Mexico (yard/office)
Permco (Airfield) (no longer shown in timetables)
Kimbrough, New Mexico (no longer shown in timetables)
Southern Union Oil
Lea County Oil
Lovington, New Mexico

See also

Fort Worth & Denver Railway
Roscoe, Snyder and Pacific Railway
West Texas and Lubbock Railway

References

External links 
Iowa Pacific Holdings' Texas–New Mexico Railroad page

New Mexico railroads
Texas railroads
Spin-offs of the Union Pacific Railroad
RailAmerica